Edward Stephenson Gamble (born 11 March 1986) is an English comedian, known for co-presenting The Peacock and Gamble Podcast and his regular appearances on Mock the Week. He studied at Durham University, where he began his comedy career performing with the Durham Revue, and was a finalist in the 2007 Chortle Student Comedy Awards.

Early life
Gamble was brought up in southwest London. He was educated at King's College School, a private day school for boys in Wimbledon, followed by Durham University where he studied philosophy, and met fellow comedians Nish Kumar and Tom Neenan. He was a member of Hatfield College.

Career
Gamble's early work was alongside Ray Peacock, with whom he presented two different series of podcasts, totalling over 100 episodes. He also appeared on television, performing a 15-minute set on the extended version of Russell Howard's Good News on BBC Three in late 2010. He performed with Peacock at the Edinburgh Festival Fringe in 2011, 2012 and 2013, as well as supporting Greg Davies on his successful 'Firing Cheeseballs at a Dog' Tour in 2011. Gamble also recorded a series of radio shows with Peacock on FUBAR Radio.

In 2014 Gamble debuted solo at Edinburgh Fringe with the show "Gambletron 5000", returning in 2015 with "Lawman" and in 2016 with "Stampede". His stand-up performances contain much observational comedy, often aimed at himself, including discussion of his diabetes, which he was diagnosed with as a teenager; he chose that as the central topic of his 2018 Edinburgh Fringe show "Blizzard" and his Amazon special, "Blood Sugar".

Gamble has been a regular panellist on the BBC panel show Mock the Week since July 2015, and also appeared with Amy Hoggart, in Almost Royal, a faux-reality show on BBC America in the same year. They played a brother and sister, Georgie and Poppy Carlton. The show was shown on E4 in the UK and was followed by a second series in 2016. He has guest-hosted the Elis James and John Robins Show on Radio X in 2017 and 2018. Gamble presents the Off Menu with Ed Gamble and James Acaster podcast with fellow comedian James Acaster since 2018, and a weekly Radio X show with Matthew Crosby since 2019.

Gamble won the ninth series of Taskmaster in 2019.

In 2020, Gamble narrated adverts for second hand car website Cazoo.

In October 2020, Gamble began presenting Taskmaster The Podcast. It is a companion of the TV show of the same name, in which the tenth series aired on Channel 4 since moving from the Dave TV channel.

In 2020, Gamble was a guest judge on Great British Menu and, in February 2022, he became one of the judges for Season 17.

In 2022, Gamble featured in the second 'Champions of Champions' episode of Taskmaster with fellow series 6-10 winners: Liza Tarbuck, Kerry Godliman, Lou Sanders and Richard Herring. He finished in last place.

In May 2022 Gamble was announced as one of six rotating co-hosts joining Alexander Armstrong on Pointless to replace Richard Osman, alongside Sally Lindsay, Konnie Huq, Lauren Laverne, Alex Brooker and Stephen Mangan.

Personal life
Gamble has type 1 diabetes, which he has addressed as part of his performances. His wife is TV producer Charlie Jamison, with whom he has been in a relationship since 2011. They were married on 9 September 2021 after postponing three times due to the COVID-19 pandemic. They have a cat called Pig.

References

External links
 
 
 
 

1986 births
Living people
English male comedians
Comedians from London
People from Hammersmith
People with type 1 diabetes
Alumni of Hatfield College, Durham
21st-century English comedians